Ton-Ton Macoute! is the 1970 debut solo album of American blues musician Johnny Jenkins. Jenkins had previously led The Pinetoppers, a band which at one time featured Otis Redding. Jenkins then appeared on two Redding albums, playing guitar, before releasing his solo debut.

Ton-Ton Macoute! was originally intended as a Duane Allman solo album, before Allman departed to form The Allman Brothers. Most of the guitar tracks were played by Allman, with Jenkins later supplying the vocal tracks. In addition to Duane Allman, the album also features three other founding members of the Allman Brothers: Berry Oakley, Jaimoe, and Butch Trucks.

Ton-Ton Macoute! is a blend of blues rock and Southern rock. It notably included covers of Dr. John's "I Walk on Guilded Splinters", Bob Dylan's "Down Along the Cove", and J.D. Loudermilk's "Bad News".

Title
In Haitian Creole, Ton-Ton Macoute means "bogeyman" (literally:
"Uncle Gunnysack"). The bogeyman in Haitian folklore was said to enter homes and kidnap disobedient children, taking them away in his gunnysack.

Ton-Ton Macoute was also the name of Haitian President Papa Doc Duvalier's secret police force, which was credited with widespread human rights violations.

Track listing
"I Walk on Guilded Splinters"  (Dr. John) - 5:49
"Leaving Trunk"  (Sleepy John Estes) - 4:19
"Blind Bats & Swamp Rats"  (Jackie Avery) - 4:44
"Rollin' Stone"  (Muddy Waters) - 5:21 (a.k.a. "Catfish Blues")
"Sick and Tired"  (Dave Bartholomew, Chris Kenner) - 4:41
"Down Along the Cove"  (Bob Dylan) - 3:25
"Bad News"  (J.D. Loudermilk) - 4:08
"Dimples"  (John Lee Hooker, James Bracken) - 2:55
"Voodoo in You"  (Jackie Avery) - 5:00
"I Don't Want No Woman"  (Don Robey) - 2:12
"My Love Will Never Die"  (Otis Rush) - 5:33

Personnel
Johnny Jenkins - vocals, guitar (4), harmonica (2, 6, 7, 8), foot stomping (4), lead guitar (10, 11)
Duane Allman - electric guitar (9 [left channel]), slide guitar (4, 6), dobro (1), rhythm guitar (10, 11)
Berry Oakley - bass (4, 6, 7)
Jaimoe - timbales (1, 3, 9)
Butch Trucks - drums (1, 9)
Paul Hornsby - Wurlitzer piano (1, 2, 3, 6, 7, 9, 11), piano (10), Hammond B-3 organ (11), rhythm guitar (6)
Eddie Hinton - cowbell (9)
Tippy Armstrong - cabasa (9)
Pete Carr - acoustic guitar (6), electric guitar (1, 9 [right channel]), guitar (2, 3, 5, 7, 8)
Robert Popwell - bass (1, 2, 3, 5, 8, 9, 10, 11), timbales (5), shaker & woodblocks (2)
Johnny Wyker - shaker & woodblocks (2)
Jimmy Nalls - guitar (7)
Ella Brown - vocals (3)
Southern Comfort - vocals (1, 9) - a group that included Donna Jean Godchaux, then named Donna Thatcher
Johnny Sandlin - drums (2, 3, 5, 6, 7, 8, 10, 11)

Production
Producer: Duane Allman, Johnny Sandlin
Recording Engineer: Johnny Sandlin, Tom Compton, Larry Hall, Larry Hamby, Jim Hawkins, Jimmy Johnson, Terry Manning
Assistant Engineer: Kent Bruce, Jeremy Stephens
Remixing: Jeff Coppage
Mastering: Denny Purcell
Art Direction: Jimmy Roberts
Photography: Jimmy Roberts
Liner Notes: Johnny Sandlin

References

Johnny Jenkins albums
Duane Allman albums
Capricorn Records albums
1970 albums
Collaborative albums